Jonny Jesus Sánchez Miquilena (born May 12, 1987) is a Venezuelan amateur boxer. He participated in the 2008 Olympics. He lost his first fight to two-time world champion Serik Sapiyev of Kazakhstan.

External links
Yahoo profile

Living people
Light-welterweight boxers
Boxers at the 2008 Summer Olympics
Olympic boxers of Venezuela
1987 births
Venezuelan male boxers
South American Games bronze medalists for Venezuela
South American Games medalists in boxing
Competitors at the 2010 South American Games
21st-century Venezuelan people